Neojulodis is a genus of beetles in the family Buprestidae, containing the following species:

 Neojulodis bequaerti (Kerremans, 1913)
 Neojulodis bouyeri Holm, 1986
 Neojulodis clermonti (Théry, 1934)
 Neojulodis hirta (Linnaeus, 1758)
 Neojulodis laticollis (Gahan, 1900)
 Neojulodis myrmido (Fairmaire, 1882)
 Neojulodis papillosa (Thunberg, 1827)
 Neojulodis picta (Thunberg, 1827)
 Neojulodis purpurescens Holm & Gussmann, 1991
 Neojulodis rufolimbata (Fairmaire, 1888)
 Neojulodis setosa (Thunberg, 1827)
 Neojulodis subcostata (Laporte, 1835)
 Neojulodis tomentosa (Olivier, 1790)
 Neojulodis vittipennis (Fåhraeus in Boheman, 1851)

References

Buprestidae genera